Mocuba  District is a district of Zambezia Province in Mozambique. The main town is Mocuba.

The district has 214748 inhabitants as of the 1997 census.

Further reading
District profile (PDF)

Districts in Zambezia Province